Abdulmalek Abd al-Rahman al-Eryani (born 1957) is a Yemeni politician. He held the post of Minister of Tourism and Environment from 2001 to 2003 in the first government of Bajmal and then from 2003 to 2006 in Bajmal's second government.

Education 
He was born in 1957 in Ibb. He studied economics in US and earned a BA degree.

References 

1957 births
20th-century Yemeni politicians
21st-century Yemeni politicians
People from Ibb Governorate
Tourism ministers of Yemen
Living people